The Routeburn River, also known as the Route Burn, is a river in New Zealand. It is a short stony river that flows for some 15 kilometres into the Dart River / Te Awa Whakatipu in the South Island. The Routeburn River flows alongside a section of the Routeburn Track. The upper reaches of the river are found in the Routeburn North Branch and leave the Routeburn Track around the Routeburn Flat Hut area.

The river has two main branches of similar length, which meet some 8 kilometres from the Dart. Both of these streams have sources in the Humboldt Range. One of these streams flows due south from the slopes of the 1960-metre Nereus Peak; the other flows south then east from Lake Wilson, a small tarn, passing through Lake Harris and over the Routeburn Falls. Several smaller streams join the river from the south closer to its entry into the Dart River.

See also
List of rivers of New Zealand

References

Rivers of Otago
Mount Aspiring National Park
Rivers of New Zealand